In economics, rent is a surplus value after all costs and normal returns have been accounted for, i.e. the difference between the price at which an output from a resource can be sold and its respective extraction and production costs, including normal return. This concept is usually termed economic rent but when referring to rent in natural resources such as coastal space or minerals, it is commonly called resource rent. It can also be conceptualised as abnormal or supernormal profit.

In practice, identifying and measuring (or collecting) resource rent is not straightforward.  At any point in time, rent depends on the availability of information, market conditions, technology and the system of property rights used to govern access to and management of resources.

Categories of rent
Rent can be categorised into different kinds depending on how it is created.  In general one can distinguish three different kinds of rent, which can also occur together: differential, scarcity, and entrepreneurial rent.

 Differential rent (also called quality or Ricardian rent) arises because of differences in the quality of similar goods or inputs (e.g. production sites). Consider two companies that extract coal of identical quality.  The market price of coal is $50/t.  Company X operates at a production site where it is very easy to extract coal.  Its costs (including normal returns) amount to $20/t.  Company Y operates at a site where it is relatively difficult to extract coal.  Its costs (including normal returns) amount to $30/t.  Company X will ‘create’ more resource rent because of the more accessible resource.
 Scarcity rent The marginal opportunity cost imposed on future generations by extracting one more unit of a resource today. Scarcity rent is one of two costs the extraction of a finite resource imposes on society. The other is marginal extraction cost--the opportunity cost of resources employed in the extraction activity. Scarcity rent is the cost of "using up" a finite resource because benefits of the extracted resource are unavailable to future generations. Efficiency is achieved when the resource price--the benefit society is willing to pay for the resource today--is equal to the sum of marginal extraction cost and scarcity rent.
 Entrepreneurial rent (also called quasi-rent or Schumpeterian rent) can accrue due to entrepreneurial skills or managerial investments.  A company may invest in advertising, training of employees, and so forth.  These investments can result in a higher price (brand) or lower costs (better technology). Consider the “production” of rock lobster where the costs to produce one rock lobster (i.e. paying for labour, the nets, and the like, and including normal profit) amount to $3. Assume the rock lobster is sold for $5 on the market.  Resource rent here amounts to $2. However, assume the fisher has managed to decrease the costs for catching rock lobster from $3 to $2.  This could be due to his/her entrepreneurial skills and more efficient use of labour and capital.  Resource rent increases from $2 to $3.

See also
 Hotelling's rule
 Resource economics

References

Resource economics